The 2018 ABC Supply 500 was the 14th round of the 2018 IndyCar Series season. The race was held on August 19 at Pocono Raceway in Long Pond, Pennsylvania. The race served as the 14th round of the 2018 IndyCar Series season. 2018 Indy 500 champion Will Power qualified on pole position, while 2016 Indy 500 champion Alexander Rossi took victory in the 200-lap race. The race was marred by a massive crash on lap 6. It happened when Ryan Hunter-Reay and rookie Robert Wickens were racing side by side for 3rd place when the two made contact in turn 2. Hunter-Reay hit the wall and Wickens' car went over the top of Hunter-Reay's car and hit the catch fence tearing the car apart. The impact sent Wickens' car spinning like a top on the straight-away. The wreck also collected James Hinchcliffe, Takuma Sato, and Pietro Fittipaldi. Hunter-Reay, Hinchcliffe, Sato, and Fittipaldi were unharmed, but Wickens sustained severe injuries and was paralyzed from the chest down as a result. Wickens has since never returned to race in IndyCar but did return to racing in 2022, driving in the Michelin Pilot Challenge.

Results

Qualifying

Race 

Notes:
 Points include 1 point for leading at least 1 lap during a race, an additional 2 points for leading the most race laps, and 1 point for Pole Position.

Championship standings after the race 

Drivers' Championship standings

Manufacturer standings

 Note: Only the top five positions are included.

References 

ABC Supply 500
ABC Supply 500
ABC Supply 500